Jón Sigurðsson  may refer to:
Jón Sigurðsson (1811–1879), the leader of the 19th century Icelandic independence movement.
Jón Sigurðsson (politician, born 1941), an Icelandic politician and former minister.
Jón Sigurðsson (politician, born 1946) (1946–2021), an Icelandic politician and minister.
Jón Sigurðsson (basketball) (born 1951), an Icelandic former basketball player and coach.
Jón Karl Sigurðsson (born 1932), Icelandic Olympic skier